The 1854 United States House of Representatives election in Florida was held on Monday, October 2, 1854 to elect the single United States Representative from the state of Florida, one from the state's single at-large congressional district, to represent Florida in the 34th Congress. The election coincided with the elections of other offices, including the senatorial election and various state and local elections.

The winning candidate would serve a two-year term in the United States House of Representatives from March 4, 1855, to March 4, 1857.

Candidates

Democratic

Nominee 

 Augustus Maxwell, incumbent U.S. representative

Whig

Nominee 

 Thomas Brown, former governor of Florida

Campaign 
Despite Brown leaving office as a popular governor, the national Whig Party had all but collapsed by this election. Additionally, many Southerners who were formerly sympathetic to the Whigs now aligned fully with the Democratic Party, due to the perception that the Whigs were willing to compromise with abolitionist Northerners. To take advantage of this, Maxwell actively campaigned in Pensacola, a former Whig stronghold, as well as running up his margins in deeply conservative North Central Florida, particularly in Columbia and Jefferson counties, both of which had high enslaved populations.

General election

Results

By County

See also
United States House of Representatives elections, 1854

References

1854
Florida
United States House of Representatives